Lies Eykens (born ) is a Belgian female volleyball player. She is part of the Belgium women's national volleyball team.

She participated in the 2015 FIVB Volleyball World Grand Prix.
On club level she played for Amigos Zoersel in 2015.

References

1989 births
Living people
Belgian women's volleyball players
Place of birth missing (living people)
21st-century Belgian women